The General Department of Defence Intelligence (GDDI; , sometimes), also recognized by its internal designation General Department II or TC2, is the strategic military intelligence agency of Vietnam, serving the Vietnam People's Armed Forces.

References

Military intelligence agencies
Military of Vietnam
Vietnamese intelligence agencies